The  was the eleventh season of the Japan Football League, the third tier of the Japanese football league system.

Overview

At the end of the 2008 season, three new clubs were promoted from the Japanese Regional Leagues by virtue of their final placing in the Regional League promotion series:
Machida Zelvia, Kanto Football League First Division champions
V-Varen Nagasaki, Kyushu Football League runners-up
Honda Lock, 3rd place at the All Japan Senior Football Championship (3rd place in Kyushu Football League)

Machida Zelvia and V-Varen Nagasaki were approved as J. League associate members at the annual meeting in January.

Sagawa Shiga won their second championship title since 2007 season.

Table

Results

Top scorers

Attendance

Promotion and relegation
Due to Kitakyushu being promoted and Mitsubishi Mizushima being relegated, the Regional League promotion series winner and runner-up, Matsumoto Yamaga and Hitachi Tochigi Uva respectively, were promoted automatically. Third-placed team, Zweigen Kanazawa were set to play FC Kariya in the promotion and relegation series.

Zweigen Kanazawa won the series at 2–1 aggregate score and earned promotion to JFL. F.C. Kariya relegated to Tōkai regional league.

References

2009
3